Brabazon may refer to:

 Baron Brabazon of Tara, a title in the Peerage of the United Kingdom
 Brabazon, Bristol, a British mixed-use development
 Brabazon baronets, a title in the Baronetage of Ireland
 Brabazon Committee, a committee set up by the British government in 1942
 Brabazon Course, one of three golf courses at the English resort and hotel The Belfry
 Bristol Brabazon, a British large propeller-driven airliner
 Major Brabazon-Plank, recurring fictional character from the Uncle Fred and Jeeves stories

People
 Chambré Brabazon, 5th Earl of Meath (1715), Irish nobleman and politician
 Francis Brabazon (1907–1984), Australian poet
 Gerald Hugh Brabazon (1854–1938), Canadian politician
 Hercules Brabazon Brabazon (1821–1906), English artist
 James Brabazon (born 1972), British documentary filmmaker, journalist, and author
 Reginald Brabazon, 12th Earl of Meath (1841–1929), Irish politician and philanthropist
 Reginald Brabazon, 13th Earl of Meath (1869–1949), Anglo-Irish soldier
 Roger Brabazon (1317), English lawyer, and Chief Justice of the King's Bench
 Ryan Brabazon (born 1986), former Australian rules footballer
 Tara Brabazon (born 1969), Dean of Graduate Research and the Professor of Cultural Studies at Flinders University
 Peter Glenville (born Peter Patrick Brabazon Browne; 1913–1996), English film and stage actor and director
 Derek Moore-Brabazon, 2nd Baron Brabazon of Tara (1910–1974)
 Ivon Moore-Brabazon, 3rd Baron Brabazon of Tara, (born 1946), British Conservative politician
 John Moore-Brabazon, 1st Baron Brabazon of Tara, (1884–1964), English aviation pioneer and Conservative politician
 Leslie Seth-Smith (also James Brabazon; 1923–2007), screenwriter and author